It's All Relative: Tillis Sings Tillis is an album by country music artist Pam Tillis, released in 2002. All of the songs were co-written by Pam and/or her father, country singer Mel Tillis. Several are covers of songs that were originally by other artists.

Track listing
"Burning Memories" (Mel Tillis, Wayne Walker) – 3:06
"So Wrong" (Carl Perkins, Danny Dill, Tillis) – 3:19
"Unmitigated Gall" (Tillis) – 3:00
"Violet and a Rose" (Thresa Auge, John Reinfeld, Little Jimmy Dickens, Tillis) – 3:54
"I Ain't Never" (Tillis, Webb Pierce) – 2:33
"Not Lke It Was With You" (Tillis) – 3:27
"Mental Revenge" (Tillis) – 4:05
"Heart Over Mind" (Tillis) – 6:12
"Goodbye Wheeling" (Tillis) – 3:42
"Emotions" (Tillis, Ramsey Kearney) – 3:26
"Honey (Open That Door)" (Tillis) – 2:52
"Detroit City" (Tillis, Dill) – 4:09
"Come On and Sing" (Tillis) – 2:48

Chart performance

References

2002 albums
Pam Tillis albums
Epic Records albums